Mayville State University (MSU or MaSU) is a public university in Mayville, North Dakota.  It is part of the North Dakota University System.

History
Founded as a normal school by provision of the North Dakota Constitution in 1889, Mayville State was granted  and organized by the first Legislative Assembly.

Classes began in 1889, with funds for the current Old Main a building provided by the Second Legislative Assembly in early 1891, where classes were initially held in 1894. In 1926, the State Board of Higher Education authorized Mayville State to grant a Bachelor of Arts in education. The Mayville Normal School thus became Mayville State Teacher's College, providing general education and offering a four-year degree. Successive additions strengthened the curriculum; and as enrollment grew, new buildings appeared.

In 1948, the B.A. in Education became a B.S. in Education and the first non-teaching Bachelor of Arts was offered in 1961. In 1973 and 1982, Mayville State College established programs in business administration and computer studies respectively. In the early 1980s, the Bachelor of Science and Bachelor of General Studies became available. The present name, Mayville State University, was approved by the legislature in 1987.

Campus 

In 1985, multiple campus buildings were recognized by the National Register of Historic Places with the creation of the Mayville Historic District.

On April 9, 2010, the university broke ground on "the first state funded building in more than 40 years." Agassiz Hall, the largest residence hall has been remodeled to provide suite- and apartment-style living accommodations for men and women. An addition to the science and library buildings is providing a new home for the Division of Education and Psychology. Great progress continues to be made on a state-funded HPER project, which involves replacement of the 1929 Old Gymnasium and expansion of classroom and lab/practice space for Sports Management, Fitness and Wellness, Health Education, and Physical Education majors.

Athletics

The Mayville State athletic teams are called the Comets. The university is a member of the National Association of Intercollegiate Athletics (NAIA), primarily competing as a member of the North Star Athletic Association (NSAA) as a founding member since the 2013–14 academic year. The Comets previously competed as an NAIA Independent within the Association of Independent Institutions (AII) from 2011–12 to 2012–13; and in these defunct conferences: the Dakota Athletic Conference (DAC) from 2000–01 to 2010–11; and the North Dakota College Athletic Conference (NDCAC) from 1922–23 to 1999–2000.

Mayville State competes in six intercollegiate varsity sports: Men's sports include baseball, basketball and football; while women's sports include basketball, softball and volleyball.

Men's basketball
The Mayville State Comets men's basketball team finished runner-up at the NAIA Division II Men's Basketball National Tournament in 2007. This is the only men's basketball team in North Dakota history to play in a national collegiate championship game.

Softball
Mayville State's softball team appeared in one Women's College World Series in 1976.

References

External links
 Official website
 Official athletics website

 
Educational institutions established in 1889
Buildings and structures in Traill County, North Dakota
Education in Traill County, North Dakota
1889 establishments in Dakota Territory
Public universities and colleges in North Dakota
Mayville, North Dakota